

The Two Wings Mariner is an American amphibious biplane designed for amateur construction by Two Wings Aviation of Forest Lake, Minnesota.

The Mariner is a metal and fabric constructed amphibious biplane with a  Rotax 447 pusher engine and a retractable tail-dragger landing gear. The aircraft has a single-seat open cockpit with an option to build as a two-seater. The aircraft can be built with a range of small engines including the Rotax 447 and Rotax 582.

Variants
Mariner UL
Ultralight variant for amateur construction.
Mariner EXP
The Mariner EXP is a variant with a  Subaru engine.

Specifications

References

Notes

Bibliography

1990s United States civil utility aircraft
Homebuilt aircraft
Biplanes
Amphibious aircraft
Single-engined pusher aircraft